Gamishli Yelqi (also Romanized as Gāmīshlī Yelqī and Gomīshlī Yelqī; also known as Vakīlī) is a village in Gorganbuy Rural District, in the Central District of Aqqala County, Golestan Province, Iran. At the 2006 census, its population was 1,466, in 324 families.

References 

Populated places in Aqqala County